Birshoghyr (Bırşoğyr, بىرشوعىر), known as Berchogur during the Soviet era, is a town in Aktobe Region, west Kazakhstan.

References

Aktobe Region
Cities and towns in Kazakhstan